Trahern (Tron) LaFavor (born November 27, 1979) is an American former professional football defensive tackle in the National Football League (NFL) for the Chicago Bears and  Dallas Cowboys. He played college football at the University of Florida.

Early years 

LaFavor was born in Fort Lauderdale, Florida in 1979. He attended Cardinal Gibbons High School, where he was a three-year starter, playing different positions on the defense. He transferred his senior year to Dillard High School in Fort Lauderdale,

As a senior in 1998, he played defensive end making 86 tackles with 20 sacks, while receiving Florida Class 6A first-team All-state and USA Today honorable-mention high school All-American honors.

College career 

LaFavor accepted a football scholarship to attend the University of Florida in Gainesville, Florida. He played for coach Steve Spurrier and coach Ron Zook's Florida Gators football team from 1999 to 2002.  As a freshman, he played in 9 out of 12 games as a backup defensive end.

As a sophomore, he was moved to defensive tackle at the end of the first month of the season. He played in all 12 games with one start at defensive end, registering 13 tackles (4 for loss), one interception and one fumble recovery. In 2000, he was a member of the Gators' Southeastern Conference (SEC) championship team.

As a junior, he played in 11 games with 9 starts at defensive tackle, posting 42 tackles (2 for loss), 6 quarterback pressures, 2 passes defensed and one fumble recovery. As a senior, he played in 13 games with 3 starts at defensive tackle. He was mostly a reserve player behind Ian Scott, collecting 51 tackles (32 solo), 2 sacks, 3 tackles for loss, 6 quarterback pressures, one pass defensed and one fumble recovery. He had 7 tackles, one quarterback pressure and one pass defensed against the University of South Carolina. LaFavor graduated from the University of Florida with a bachelor's degree in sociology in 2003.

Professional career

Chicago Bears
LaFavor  was selected by the Chicago Bears in the fifth round (171st pick overall) of the 2003 NFL Draft. As a rookie, he played in four games and was declared inactive in 12 contests. He was waived on August 30, 2004.

Carolina Panthers
On October 13, 2004, he was signed by Carolina Panthers to their practice squad.

Dallas Cowboys
On November 23, 2004, he was signed by the Dallas Cowboys to their practice squad. On December 28, he was promoted to the active roster and was declared inactive for the last game of the season. He was released on May 3, 2005.

Baltimore Ravens
On August 4, 2005, he was signed as a free agent by the Baltimore Ravens. He was released on August 29.

See also 

 List of Chicago Bears players
 List of Florida Gators in the NFL Draft
 List of University of Florida alumni

References

Bibliography 

Carlson, Norm, University of Florida Football Vault: The History of the Florida Gators, Whitman Publishing, LLC, Atlanta, Georgia (2007).  .
Golenbock, Peter, Go Gators!  An Oral History of Florida's Pursuit of Gridiron Glory, Legends Publishing, LLC, St. Petersburg, Florida (2002).  .
Hairston, Jack, Tales from the Gator Swamp: A Collection of the Greatest Gator Stories Ever Told, Sports Publishing, LLC, Champaign, Illinois (2002).  .
McCarthy, Kevin M.,  Fightin' Gators: A History of University of Florida Football, Arcadia Publishing, Mount Pleasant, South Carolina (2000).  

1979 births
Living people
Players of American football from Fort Lauderdale, Florida
American football defensive tackles
Florida Gators football players
Chicago Bears players
Carolina Panthers players
Dallas Cowboys players
Baltimore Ravens players